Centre sportif du Bout-du-Monde, Bout-du-Monde Sports Center, is located on the banks of the Arve in the city of Geneva, Switzerland.

The site offers following outdoor sports grounds:

two training and competition soccer fields in stabilized material and three competitive turf pitches in natural turf;
a cricket field which can also be used for soccer training;
three basketball courts;
three volleyball courts;
a complete athletic facility that meets IAAF standards;
a climbing wall;
a 1.3 km cross-country run;
an illuminated bike trail.

Address
Centre sportif du Bout-du-Monde
Route de Vessy 12
1206 Genève

References

External links

 Des agents patrouillent au Bout-du-Monde
 Centre Sportif du Bout-du-Monde , a place for just about any sport
 La Coupe de Suisse est de retour à Genève
 Double succès français au Bout-du-Monde

Sport in Geneva
Sports venues in Switzerland